Larissa Lam is a singer, songwriter, Chinese American talk show host, music executive, filmmaker, and producer from Diamond Bar, California. She won the 2015 Hollywood Music in Media Award in the Best Dance Song category for her song "I Feel Alive". She was named Best Vocalist of the Month by SingerUniverse Magazine in November 2015. Larissa is one of the hosts for radio advice show, U-Talk Radio.

She released her fourth solo album of 12 original songs, Love and Discovery, on June 16, 2015. She has released three previous solo albums On the Way Up (2001), Thankful to be Live (2003) and Revolutionary (2004). A remix version of Larissa Lam's song, "Breathing More" appears in the video game Dance Dance Revolution Universe 2.  She has also composed instrumental music for The Oprah Winfrey Show, The Dr. Oz Show, TLC, and The Daily 10 on the E! Channel.

Larissa is known as the "Singing CFO." She was the former Chief Financial Officer of EDM label, NSOUL Records.

She was a lead singer in the group Nitro Praise which was produced by acclaimed DJ Scott Blackwell. She recorded songs for Nitro Praise 5, Nitro Praise Live! and Nitro Praise Christmas 2. She toured as a member of Nitro Praise alongside Maximillian, JR Barbee and Danielle Pericelli.

Early life 
Larissa Lam grew up in Diamond Bar, CA. She graduated from UCLA with a degree in business economics.

Record label

Lam is also the founder of her own record label, LOG Records. It was represents artists in the Dance, EDM, Hip-Hop, Rock, Pop and R&B genres.

In 2010, Lam executive produced a hip hop album for Only Won.  Only Won and Larissa Lam launched a viral music video title "Cantonese Boy" which was a parody of the Grammy winning song American Boy by Kanye West and Estelle. After being seen performing "Cantonese Boy" in Chinatown, Larissa Lam was asked to perform at the 2010 Green Globe Film Awards as they honored Asians in film and entertainment.

In 2012, Larissa produced two songs for Only Won that was released on the video game Sleeping Dogs.

In 2013, Larissa produced the song "JUN BAY" (aka: Get ready) that was featured on the film Dead Man Down and composed original music for the animated film, "The Monkey Prince".

In 2015, Larissa released of her fourth solo album produced by David Longoria titled, "Love & Discovery". The album features remixes by Robert Eibach.

Discography and releases

Engineer (Rocketeer) - Only Won Parody Cover (2013)
Airplanes - One Truth Cover (July 28, 2010)
Only Won - The Lyrical Engineer (Jan 1, 2010)
Beautiful Faith (November 14, 2008)
On the Way Up (June 5, 2001)

She also appears on Gone - Music from the Motion Picture (2002).

Hosting 
She was one of the original  hosts of the talk show, Top 3, which airs on JUCE TV formerly called, JCTV. She also starred in Season 1 and 2 on the JCTV reality show, ''Cruise with a Cause'." She is one of the hosts of UTalk Radio, an advice show for young adults.

Film Maker 
In 2015, Lam made her directorial debut and co-produced with a Documentary short titled, "Finding Cleveland" with Only Won.  It garnished multiple nominations for Best Documentary. The story started as a journey for Only Won's search for his family roots, but instead of taking him to the far east, it took him into the deep south of Cleveland, MS. While the 14-minute documentary focuses on the family's discoveries about their roots, it also touches on a broader history, such as the treatment of Chinese immigrants in the region and the role the 1882 Chinese Exclusion Act played in that. She directed a feature film called Far East Deep South that was released in 2020.

Personal life 
Larissa Lam is married to hip-hop artist Only Won. The couple currently reside in Los Angeles, California.

References

External links
The Official Site Of Larissa Lam
Review of Larisa Lam's On The Way Up
Larissa Lam Contemporary Christian Music Magazine
Larissa Lam: The Revolutionary Singing CFO
CD Shakedown Review of Larissa Lam's On the Way Up
Asian Am artist Larissa Lam makes Top 10 of LA radio contest
Larissa Lam Interview
Larissa Lam Strips Down for Genghis Cohen

1975 births
Living people
American women composers
21st-century American composers
American women singer-songwriters
American music industry executives
American musicians of Chinese descent
American people of Hong Kong descent
Record producers from California
American television talk show hosts
American women in business
Businesspeople from Los Angeles
Musicians from Los Angeles
People from Diamond Bar, California
Musicians from Pasadena, California
American chief financial officers
Singer-songwriters from California
Women chief financial officers
21st-century American singers
21st-century American women singers
American women record producers
21st-century women composers